Moulton Park is a large industrial estate near the village of Moulton, Northamptonshire a few miles north of the town of Northampton.

Business park
Nationwide Building Society have a main office on the business park, near to the BLC Leather Technology Centre (former British Leather Manufacturers' Research Association).

Transmitter
The main transmitter for BBC Radio Northampton on 104.2FM is to the west of Moulton Park near the University of Northampton (former Nene College) on Boughton Green Road. It also carries national FM radio.

References

External links

 Moulton Park transmitter

Business parks of England
Geography of Northamptonshire
Economy of Northamptonshire
Mass media in the East Midlands
West Northamptonshire District
Transmitter sites in England